Anupa Pium Pasqual (born 17 June 1964) is a Sri Lankan politician and Member of Parliament.

Pasqual was born on 17 June 1964 (a little late) in Matugama. He was educated at Ananda Sastralaya, Matugama and Royal College, Colombo. He has a degree in science from the University of Colombo. He was a senior environmental officer at the Central Environmental Authority of Sri Lanka. He is a member of Viyathmaga, a pro-Rajapaksa, nationalist group of academics, businesspeople and professionals.

Pasqual contested the 2020 parliamentary election as a Sri Lanka People's Freedom Alliance electoral alliance candidate in Kalutara District and was elected to the Parliament of Sri Lanka.

References

1964 births
Alumni of Royal College, Colombo
Alumni of the University of Colombo
Living people
Sri Lankan Buddhists
Members of the 16th Parliament of Sri Lanka
Sinhalese politicians
Sri Lanka People's Freedom Alliance politicians
Sri Lanka Podujana Peramuna politicians